Jason M. Bonsignore (born April 15, 1976) is an American former professional ice hockey forward and speedway promoter and racer.

Early life
Bonsignore was born in Rochester, New York. As a youth, Bonsignore played in the 1990 Quebec International Pee-Wee Hockey Tournament with a minor ice hockey team from Rochester.

Career 
Bonsignore was a First Round draft choice in the OHL by the Newmarket Royals and went on to star in the league with the Royals, then Niagara Falls Thunder, where he was an asst Captain and finally with Sudbury Wolves where he was OHL player of the week in January of 95 and set a Wolves record for most game winning goals in the playoffs. He      was drafted in the first round of the 1994 NHL Entry Draft, fourth overall, by the Edmonton Oilers, from the Niagara Falls in the Ontario Hockey League. While playing for the Oilers' American Hockey League farm team in the 1997–98 season, he was traded to the Tampa Bay Lightning. He was Tampa Bay's leading rookie scorer his first year while also earning International Hockey League player of the week recognition during a short stay with Tampa's farm team in Cleveland. In his 1998–99 season with Tampa, he finished the year as a regular with the Lightning.

Not given a qualifying offer by the Lightning, Bonsignore became an unrestricted free agent and signed with the Toronto Maple Leafs organization for the 1999–2000 season. He was a late cut at training camp and was assigned to their AHL farm team in St John's. Bonsignore suffered a season-ending ankle injury mid season, and asked for a release.

He chose to sit out the next two years due to the ankle injury and personal reasons, then returned in the 2002–03 season to play with the AHL franchises in Springfield and Lowell, where he was runner up for the Brian Pad Comeback Player of the year award given out by the Professional Hockey Players Association. He tried out with the NHL's Atlanta Thrashers in 2003 but was released towards the end of training camp.

From the 2003–04 through the 2007–08 seasons, Bonsignore played hockey in the ECHL, Switzerland, Finland and Norway. While in Switzerland he won the Player of the month award for February.

In 2007–08, Bonsignore returned to North America, where he tried to rehabilitate from a groin injury suffered in Norway while playing a few games with the Fresno Falcons. At the time the New Jersey Devils signed him for their farm team, the Trenton Devils, where he finished the year and ended his career as a professional player.

Internationally, Bonsignore was the leading scorer on the USA Select 16 and 17 National teams and also spent time with the US Olympic team. He twice represented the USA in the World Junior Championships.   

Bonsignore later coached Rochester Red Wings minor ice hockey team, and signed to play with the Hamilton Steelhawks in January 2016.

Transactions
December 30, 1997 – Edmonton trades Bonsignore, Bryan Marchment and Steve Kelly to Tampa Bay in exchange for Roman Hamrlík and the rights to Paul Comrie. 
July 15, 1999 – Toronto signs Bonsignore.
December 13, 2002 – Phoenix signs Bonsignore.
September 21, 2003 – Atlanta releases Bonsignore from NHL tryout during training camp.

Career statistics

Regular season and playoffs

International

References

External links

 SM-liiga official website
 Speedway site

1976 births
American men's ice hockey centers
Cape Breton Oilers players
Cleveland Lumberjacks players
Edmonton Oilers draft picks
Edmonton Oilers players
EHC Biel players
Fresno Falcons players
Hamilton Bulldogs (AHL) players
Ice hockey players from New York (state)
Ilves players
Las Vegas Wranglers players
Living people
Lowell Lock Monsters players
National Hockey League first-round draft picks
Newmarket Royals players
Niagara Falls Thunder players
Lahti Pelicans players
San Antonio Dragons players
South Carolina Stingrays players
Sportspeople from Rochester, New York
Springfield Falcons players
St. John's Maple Leafs players
Sudbury Wolves players
Tampa Bay Lightning players
Trenton Devils players
Trondheim Black Panthers players